David Michael Curtis (born 10 April 1965) is a former Zimbabwean-born Irish rugby union international. He also played some first-class cricket while at Oxford University.

Career

Curtis was born in Salisbury, the capital city of Rhodesia, now known as Zimbabwe. He made his debut for Ireland against Wales in the 1991 Five Nations. He represented Ireland at the World Cup later that year, scoring a try in the pool stage against his country of birth and participating in their losing quarter-final team. In all he was capped for Ireland on 13 occasions and scored his only other points courtesy of a drop goal in an international friendly against Namibia.

He qualified for Ireland through his father Arthur Bryan  who had also represented his country as a wing forward in 1950.

His four first-class cricket matches were for Oxford University in 1990, playing against Leicestershire, Glamorgan, Nottinghamshire and Cambridge. A right-handed batsman, he made 89 runs at 22.25.

Personal life

He now lives in Zimbabwe, making a living through selling wine and craft beer. He has three sons, Angus who currently plays for Ulster, Graham and Simon, and a daughter Annabel.

See also

 List of Irish cricket and rugby union players

References

External links
Cricinfo: David Curtis
Scrum.com: David Curtis

1965 births
Living people
Cricketers from Harare
Zimbabwean people of Irish descent
White Rhodesian people
Alumni of Falcon College
University of Cape Town alumni
Alumni of St Anne's College, Oxford
Connacht Rugby players
Irish rugby union players
Ireland international rugby union players
Irish Exiles rugby union players
Irish cricketers
Oxford University cricketers
Zimbabwean emigrants to Ireland
Zimbabwean rugby union players
Sportspeople from Harare
Rugby union centres